To Pontiki ("The Mouse") is a Greek weekly newspaper published by Antonis Delatolas. It is mainly satirical/political. Its policy direction is on the centre-left.

It was founded by Costas Papaioannou, who died on 4 March 2022.

References

External links 
 Το ΠΟΝΤΙΚΙ

Weekly newspapers published in Greece
Greek-language newspapers
Satirical magazines published in Greece